Shakti Singh Yadav is an Indian politician. He was elected to the Bihar Legislative Assembly from Hilsa in the 2015 Bihar Legislative Assembly election as a member of the Rashtriya Janata Dal. He is Currently Spokesperson of Rashtriya Janata Dal.

References

1973 births
Living people
Bihar MLAs 2015–2020
Rashtriya Janata Dal politicians
People from Nalanda district